International rankings of

Politics

Transparency International 2019 Corruption Perceptions Index, ranked 160 out of 179
Reporters Without Borders 2020 Press Freedom Index, ranked 178 out of 180 countries
World Justice Project Rule of Law Index 2019, not ranked out of 126 countries

Society

References

Politics of Eritrea
Government of Eritrea
Corruption in Eritrea